Rowing at the 2008 Summer Paralympics was held in Shunyi Olympic Rowing-Canoeing Park from 9 September to 11 September. This was the first time that rowing was competed at the Paralympic Games.

Classification
Rowers were given a classification depending on the type and extent of their disability. The classification system allows rowers to compete against others with a similar level of function.

Rowing classes were:
LTA (Legs, Trunk and Arms) - Mixed coxed fours
TA (Trunk and Arms) - Mixed double sculls
A (Arms only) - Men's and women's singles

Events
Four rowing events were held:
Men's Single Sculls A
Women's Single Sculls A
Mixed Double Sculls TA
Mixed Four Coxed LTA

Participating countries
There were 108 athletes (56 male, 52 female) from 23 nations taking part in this sport.

Medal summary

Medal table

This ranking sorts countries by the number of gold medals earned by their rowers (in this context a country is an entity represented by a National Paralympic Committee). The number of silver medals is taken into consideration next and then the number of bronze medals. If, after the above, countries are still tied, equal ranking is given and they are listed alphabetically.

Medalists

See also
Rowing at the 2008 Summer Olympics

References

External links
Official Site of the 2008 Summer Paralympics

 
2008
2008 Summer Paralympics events
Paralympics
Rowing competitions in China